Paul Edward Goldschmidt (born September 10, 1987) is an American professional baseball first baseman for the St. Louis Cardinals of Major League Baseball (MLB).

Lightly recruited out of The Woodlands High School in The Woodlands, Texas, Goldschmidt played for the Texas State Bobcats, and was selected by the Arizona Diamondbacks in the eighth round of the 2009 MLB draft. He made his MLB debut with them in 2011, and they traded him to the Cardinals during the 2018–19 offseason.

Goldschmidt is a seven-time MLB All-Star. He led the National League (NL) in home runs and runs batted in during the 2013 season. He has won the NL Hank Aaron Award, Gold Glove Award, and Silver Slugger Award. Goldschmidt has twice finished runner-up for the NL Major League Baseball Most Valuable Player Award, in 2013 and 2015, before finally winning the award in 2022.

Early life
Goldschmidt was born in Wilmington, Delaware, on September 10, 1987. He grew up a Houston Astros fan. His parents, David and Kim, met at the Rochester Institute of Technology. His mother is Catholic and his father is Jewish. Goldschmidt and his two younger brothers were raised Catholic. His Jewish great-grandparents Paul and Ilse Goldschmidt and his grandfather, Ernie (who now lives in Fort Lauderdale, Florida), escaped Nazi Germany in 1938 before the Holocaust. Goldschmidt said he and his two brothers "know our Jewish history and we respect those beliefs. We had both sides of it as kids. My dad's side, my mom's side. We were exposed to all of it." The Goldschmidt family moved from Wilmington to Dallas, and then to Houston, because of the flooring company his family owns. He grew up in The Woodlands, Texas, and attended The Woodlands High School and played for their baseball team. They won the state championship in 2006, with Goldschmidt playing as the team's third baseman.

College career
He enrolled at Texas State University to play college baseball for the Texas State Bobcats baseball team. He was named the Southland Conference hitter of the year in 2008 and 2009, Southland player of the year in 2009, and was a third-team All-American as a junior in 2009 after hitting .352 with 18 home runs and 88 runs batted in (RBIs) in 57 games played. Goldschmidt set Bobcat career records with 36 home runs and 179 RBIs.

Professional career

Drafts and minor leagues
The Los Angeles Dodgers selected Goldschmidt in the 49th round of the 2006 MLB draft. The Dodgers knew he was a long shot to sign with them, but selected him nonetheless. Goldschmidt played with the son of one of the Dodgers' scouts. The Arizona Diamondbacks selected Goldschmidt in the eighth round, with the 246th overall selection, of the 2009 MLB draft. He signed with the Diamondbacks, receiving a $95,000 signing bonus. The Diamondbacks assigned Goldschmidt to the Missoula Osprey of the Rookie-level Pioneer League, where he hit .334 and 18 home runs along with 62 RBIs in his first 74 professional games. The 18 home runs were a Missoula franchise record. The following year, playing for the Visalia Rawhide in the Class A-Advanced California League, he hit 35 home runs, the most for all Class A players, and one behind Mike Moustakas and Mark Trumbo for the Joe Bauman Home Run Award. He was selected as an all-star and won the California League Most Valuable Player Award. He was also named the Arizona Diamondbacks Minor League Player of the Year.

In 2011, Goldschmidt played for the Mobile Bay Bears of the Class AA Southern League. He had a .306 batting average, 30 home runs, and 94 RBIs in 103 games played through the end of July, leading all minor leaguers in home runs and RBIs, while his 82 walks was third-best. After the season, Goldschmidt was again named the Diamondbacks' player of the year, a Baseball America first-team Minor League All-Star, Class AA all-star first baseman, Southern League all-star first baseman, and the Southern League's Most Valuable Player.

Arizona Diamondbacks (2011–2018)

2011–2014
The Diamondbacks promoted Goldschmidt to the major leagues on August 1, 2011. The Diamondbacks intended to platoon Goldschmidt with Xavier Nady. Goldschmidt recorded a base hit in his first MLB at-bat on August 1, and hit his first MLB home run the next day off San Francisco Giants pitcher Tim Lincecum. After Nady broke his wrist in mid-August, the Diamondbacks signed Lyle Overbay to replace him. Goldschmidt credited Overbay for his mentorship. Goldschmidt struck out 20 times in his first 44 MLB at-bats. In his rookie season, Goldschmidt batted .250 with eight home runs and 26 RBI in 48 games.

The Diamondbacks made the postseason, and played against the Milwaukee Brewers in the 2011 National League Division Series (NLDS). In Game 3, Goldschmidt hit a grand slam to extend the team's lead in its first victory of the series. His home run was the third grand slam by a rookie in MLB postseason history. The Diamondbacks lost the series in five games, and Goldschmidt batted .438 with six RBIs and an OBP of .526.

Goldschmidt and Overbay made the Diamondbacks' Opening Day roster in 2012. Goldschmidt hit his first career regular-season grand slam on June 1, 2012, off of Chicago Cubs pitcher Carlos Mármol at Wrigley Field. Four days later, Goldschmidt hit another grand slam off St. Louis Cardinals reliever Maikel Cleto. Overbay played sparingly, and was designated for assignment at the end of July. In 2012, Goldschmidt played 145 games and batted .286 with 20 home runs, 82 runs, 82 RBIs, 43 doubles, and 18 stolen bases.

Before the 2013 season, the Diamondbacks and Goldschmidt agreed to a $32 million contract covering the 2014 through 2018 seasons with a club option for the 2019 season worth $14.5 million. He would not have been eligible for salary arbitration until the 2014–15 offseason and free agency until the 2017–18 offseason. Goldschmidt was selected to the National League's team in the 2013 Major League Baseball All-Star Game. Goldschmidt doubled with two outs in the ninth inning, one of only three hits for the National League, and the only extra-base hit. On August 13, he hit a game-tying home run against the Baltimore Orioles in the bottom of the ninth inning to send the game into extra innings. Goldschmidt then hit a walk-off home run in the bottom of the eleventh. Goldschmidt hit a third grand slam on August 20, 2013, against J. J. Hoover of the Cincinnati Reds. In 160 games that season, he attained a .302 batting average, 36 home runs, and 125 RBI. Goldschmidt finished second in the voting for the National League's Most Valuable Player Award, behind Pittsburgh Pirates outfielder Andrew McCutchen. He led MLB with four walk-off hits in 2013.

Goldschmidt was the starting first baseman for the National League in the 2014 MLB All-Star Game. In 2014, Goldschmidt batted .300 with 19 home runs, 75 runs, and 69 RBIs. While playing against the Pittsburgh Pirates on August 1, Goldschmidt was hit by a pitch from Ernesto Frieri and left the game. The resulting impact broke a bone in his left hand, which prematurely ended his season.

2015–2018
On June 10, 2015, Goldschmidt hit his 100th career home run against Brett Anderson of the Los Angeles Dodgers. At the time of his 100th home run, Goldschmidt was sixth on the Diamondbacks' all-time home run list. Later that year, Goldschmidt was again the starting first baseman for the National League in the All-Star Game. Goldschmidt attained a .321 batting average with 33 home runs and 110 RBIs, with a major-league leading 29 intentional walks, in 2015. He also was 2nd in the league in power-speed number (25.7). He won his second Gold Glove Award and Silver Slugger Award. For the second time in three seasons, Goldschmidt was voted the runner-up for the National League Most Valuable Player Award, this time finishing behind Washington Nationals outfielder Bryce Harper.

In 2016, Goldschmidt batted .297 with 24 home runs, 106 runs, and 95 RBIs in 579 at-bats. He also was third in the league in power–speed number (27.4). He was selected to appear in the 2016 MLB All-Star Game, where he went 0-for-3.

On August 3, 2017, Goldschmidt hit three home runs in a game for the first time, bolstering the Diamondbacks' 10–8 win over the Chicago Cubs. For the fifth time in his career, Goldschmidt was named to the National League's All-Star Team. On September 13, 2017, in a game against the Colorado Rockies, Goldschmidt recorded his 1,000th career hit. Goldschmidt finished the 2017 season batting .297 with 36 home runs, 117 runs, and 120 RBIs. He tied for the National League lead in power-speed number (24.0). After the season, Goldschmidt was awarded his third Gold Glove Award and Silver Slugger Award. He also finished third in voting for the National League Most Valuable Player Award.

In the 2017 National League Wild Card Game, Goldschmidt hit a three-run home run in the first inning that helped the Diamondbacks to win 11–8 over the Rockies. During the 2017 NLDS, Goldschmidt batted only .091. The Diamondbacks lost the series to the Los Angeles Dodgers.

Through the first 20 games in May of the 2018 season, Goldschmidt struggled, managing to get only seven hits out of 73 at-bats (.096). At the time, this lowered his batting average for the season to just .198. Goldschmidt improved in the following month, recording a .390 batting average between the dates of June 1 and July 3. For the month of June, he won the National League Player of the Month Award for the first time in his career. His efforts earned him a spot on the All-Star Team for a sixth consecutive year. On August 3, 2018, Goldschmidt hit his 200th career home run against Chris Stratton of the San Francisco Giants. Goldschmidt finished the 2018 season batting .290 with 33 home runs, 95 runs, and 83 RBIs. His 1,088 games played, 209 home runs, 710 RBIs, 1,179 hits, 708 runs scored, and 267 doubles are second in Diamondbacks' history, behind Luis Gonzalez. After the season, the Diamondbacks exercised the $14.5 million option on Goldschmidt's contract for the 2019 season.

St. Louis Cardinals (2019–present)
On December 5, 2018, the Diamondbacks traded Goldschmidt to the St. Louis Cardinals in exchange for Luke Weaver, Carson Kelly, Andy Young, and a Competitive Balance Round B pick in the 2019 MLB draft.

2019 
On March 23, 2019, Goldschmidt and the Cardinals agreed to a five-year contract extension worth $130 million, spanning the 2020–24 seasons. The deal became the largest in team history, eclipsing the seven-year, $120 million contract with Matt Holliday signed in 2010. In his second game with the Cardinals against the Milwaukee Brewers, he hit three home runs and became the first player in Major League history to hit three homers in either his first or second game with a new team.

On April 20, 2019, in a game against the New York Mets Goldschmidt hit a 465-foot home run off Paul Sewald that would become both his longest career home run and the longest home run hit at Busch Stadium during the Statcast era. On June 21, 2019, in a game against the Los Angeles Angels, Goldschmidt hit a foul ball that ended up flying over the upper deck seating and out of the stadium, the first such occurrence in the current Busch Stadium. On July 26, 2019, in a game against the Houston Astros, Goldschmidt reached a streak of six home runs in six consecutive games for the first time in his career, also tying the Cardinals franchise record previously set by Matt Carpenter and Mark McGwire. Goldschmidt finished his 2019 regular season, and his first season as a Cardinal, slashing .260/.346/.476 with 34 home runs and 97 RBIs over 161 games. On defense, he had the best fielding percentage of all major league first basemen (.996). Following the season, he was nominated for his first ever Gold Glove in a Cardinals uniform.

2020 
In 2020, Goldschmidt appeared in 58 games batting .304/.417/.466 with six home runs and 21 RBIs in 231 at-bats. On October 28, 2020, he underwent surgery to have a bone spur removed out of his right elbow.

2021
On April 13, 2021, against the Washington Nationals, Goldschmidt hit his 250th career home run. Goldschmidt finished the 2021 season with 603 at-bats over 158 games, slashing .294/.365/.514 with 31 home runs and 99 RBIs. He won the Gold Glove Award at first base, being one of five Cardinals (an MLB record) to win the award.

2022 
On May 23, 2022, Goldschmidt hit a walk-off grand slam in the bottom of the tenth inning versus the Toronto Blue Jays for a 7–3 win.  That grand slam extended Goldschmidt's hitting streak to 15 games, during which he hit .438 with 28 hits, 12 doubles, five home runs, and 22 RBI.  Since RBI became an official statistic in 1920, no major leaguer had previously achieved all of those totals during any 15-game span.  For the month of May, Goldschmidt led the major leagues with a 1.288 OPS and 33 RBI, alongside leading the National League with a .404 average.  His ten home runs ranked second in the NL.  He was named the NL Player of the Month.

The hit streak continued for 25 games until June 4 versus the Chicago Cubs, when Goldschmidt was 0-for-2 with two bases on balls.  Over the 25 games, he batted .424 (42-for-99)/.482/.869, 24 extra base hits and 36 RBI.  It was the longest by a Cardinal since Albert Pujols hit in 30 straight in 2003, and tied for third-longest for the Cardinals since 1963.

Goldschmidt reached base safely in 46 consecutive games, which ended on June 11, 2022, versus the Cincinnati Reds.

In a two-game span versus the Pittsburgh Pirates on June 14–15, 2022, Goldschmidt achieved nine hits in 12 at bats with four home runs, six runs scored, nine RBI, a double, and no strikeouts.  No player had matched or exceeded those totals with zero strikeouts over a two-game span since Ty Cobb on May 5–6, 1925, when the Detroit Tigers visited the St. Louis Browns.  On June 21, Goldschmidt claimed his fourth Player of the Week award after having batted .467 (14-for-30), with four home runs, 11 RBI, and a .967 slugging percentage.  He tallied at least one base hit in each of the seven games over the week, including four multi-hit games. On July 5, 2022, Goldschmidt scored his 1,000th run in a contest versus Atlanta. On July 16, he hit his 300th career home run in a game against Cincinnati, the 153rd major leaguer to reach the milestone.

Goldschmidt was named the starting first baseman for the National League at the MLB All-Star Game, played at Dodger Stadium.  In the first inning, he hit his first career home run in an All-Star Game.

On July 24, it was announced that Goldschmidt, along with teammate Nolan Arenado, would not be allowed to travel with the Cardinals to Toronto for a scheduled series against the Blue Jays, due to his lack of a COVID-19 vaccination.

At the end of the season, Goldschmidt led the National League with a .578 slugging percentage and .981 OPS while ranking second with 115 RBIs, 324 total bases and a .404 on-base percentage. His .317 batting average and 35 home runs were ranked third and tied-fifth respectively in the NL. Goldschmidt was named the 2022 NL Hank Aaron Award winner. He was named a finalist for the National League Most Valuable Player Award alongside teammate Nolan Arenado and Manny Machado. Goldschmidt was awarded his fifth Silver Slugger Award, giving him the all-time record for Silver Sluggers won among First Basemen. On November 17, Goldschmidt won his first NL MVP, garnering 22 of 30 first-place votes.

International career
Goldschmidt was selected to the United States national baseball team for the 2017 World Baseball Classic, splitting time at first base with Eric Hosmer. In 13 at-bats, he slashed .077/.250/.077 with three walks. Team USA would go on to win the tournament.

On August 6, 2022, Goldschmidt announced that he would again play for the United States in the 2023 World Baseball Classic.

Personal life
Goldschmidt met his wife, Amy, during his freshman year at Texas State; they married in October 2010. The couple have two children, a son and a daughter. Goldschmidt became an evangelical Christian as an adult; he has Jewish and German ancestry. In September 2013, Goldschmidt graduated from the University of Phoenix with a Bachelor of Science degree in management.

Goldschmidt owned a home in Scottsdale, Arizona, selling it in 2020. That same year, he bought a home in Palm Beach Gardens, Florida, purchasing it from South African golfer Louis Oosthuizen.

During his tenure with the Diamondbacks Goldschmidt set up a charity, called "Goldy's Fund 4 Kids". His charity has hosted bowling events, which raises funds for Phoenix Children's Hospital.

See also

 List of Arizona Diamondbacks team records
 List of Jews in sports
 List of Major League Baseball annual putouts leaders
 List of Major League Baseball career assists as a first baseman leaders
 List of Major League Baseball career games played as a first baseman leaders
 List of Major League Baseball career home run leaders
 List of Major League Baseball career OPS leaders
 List of Major League Baseball career putouts leaders
 List of Major League Baseball career slugging percentage leaders
 List of people from Wilmington, Delaware
 List of Texas State University alumni
 St. Louis Cardinals award winners and league leaders

References
Footnotes

Sources

External links

1987 births
Living people
American people of German-Jewish descent
Arizona Diamondbacks players
Baseball players from Texas
Christians from Texas
Gold Glove Award winners
Major League Baseball first basemen
Missoula Osprey players
Mobile BayBears players
National League All-Stars
National League home run champions
National League Most Valuable Player Award winners
National League RBI champions
People from The Woodlands, Texas
Silver Slugger Award winners
Sportspeople from Harris County, Texas
Baseball players from Wilmington, Delaware
St. Louis Cardinals players
Texas State Bobcats baseball players
University of Phoenix alumni
Visalia Rawhide players
World Baseball Classic players of the United States
2017 World Baseball Classic players
Anchorage Bucs players
2023 World Baseball Classic players